Scipio Township may refer to:

Indiana
 Scipio Township, Allen County, Indiana
 Scipio Township, LaPorte County, Indiana

Michigan
 Scipio Township, Michigan

Ohio
 Scipio Township, Meigs County, Ohio
 Scipio Township, Seneca County, Ohio

Township name disambiguation pages